The Torkel Opsahl Academic EPublisher (TOAEP) is an academic publisher specializing in international law and policy.  Established in 2010, it is named after Torkel Opsahl, 

TOAEP grew out of the Peace Research Institute Oslo (PRIO) as a research project. It is owned by the Centre for International Law Research and Policy (CILRAP), an independent international research centre in Brussels, Belgium, but it has editorial independence.

The TOAEP was the first academic  e-publisher in international law, publishing both in print and freely online.  It has five publication series in international criminal and humanitarian law, and other areas of international law, which are all available online and may be downloaded free of charge. Its publications can also be accessed through the ICC Legal Tools Database and Lexsitus.

TOAEP's Editor-in-Chief is Morten Bergsmo, and it draws on an international team of editors and editorial assistants. TOAEP has published more than 560 authors from around the world.  There have been more than 40 reviews of TOAEP books in international law journals and yearbooks since 2010. TOAEP has more than 40,000 subscribers to its new publications.

Some books published by TOAEP 

 'A Theory of Punishable Participation in Universal Crimes', 2018, 744 pp.;
'Philosophical Foundations of International Criminal Law: Foundational Concepts', 2019, 333 pp.;
'Philosophical Foundations of International Criminal Law: Correlating Thinkers', 2018, 804 pp.;
'Quality Control in Preliminary Examination: Volume 1', 2018, 706 pp.;
'Quality Control in Preliminary Examination: Volume 2', 2018, 764 pp.;
'Possibilities and Impossibilities in a Contradictory Global Order', 2018, 204 pp.;
'Counterfactual History and Bosnia-Herzegovina', 2018, 271 pp.;
'Commentary on the Law of the International Criminal Court', 2017, 813 pp.;
'Historical War Crimes Trials in Asia', 2016, 397 pp.;
 'Double Standards: International Criminal Law and the West', 2015, 141 pp.;
 'Military Self-Interest in Accountability for Core International Crimes', 2015, 470 pp.;
'Historical Origins of International Criminal Law: Volume 5', 2017, 1180 pp.;
 'Historical Origins of International Criminal Law: Volume 4', 2015, 996 pp.;
 'Historical Origins of International Criminal Law: Volume 3', 2015, 837 pp.;
 'Historical Origins of International Criminal Law: Volume 2', 2014, 805 pp.;
 'Historical Origins of International Criminal Law: Volume 1', 2014, 720 pp.;
 'Quality Control in Fact-Finding', 2013, 500 pp.;
'On the Proposed Crimes Against Humanity Convention', 2014, 503 pp.;
 'The Concept of Universal Crimes in International Law', 2012, 361 pp.

References

External links
 http://www.toaep.org/
https://www.cilrap.org/purpose/
https://cilrap-lexsitus.org/
https://www.legal-tools.org/en/search/

Non-profit academic publishers